Mathew John Waters (born 29 May 1989) is an Australian actor best known for his roles in Round the Twist, Snobs, The Pacific, Peter Pan and the original cast of the musical The Boy From Oz, where he played the roles of musician/entertainer Young Peter Allen.

Career
Waters' acting career began at age eight when he was selected from more than 1,000 boys to play the role of young Peter Allen in the musical biopic The Boy From Oz. Waters' career went from strength to strength after landing starring roles in a number of Australian TV series with a worldwide cult following, namely as Bronson Twist in Round The Twist (series 3 & 4), as Scratch in The Escape of The Artful Dodger, and as Spike in Snobs.

Waters went on to star in a number of musicals such as Mame and as The Artful Dodger in Oliver! The Musical" before turning his hand to film. In 2003, he was invited to play a role in Peter Pan, after P. J. Hogan had seen him perform in Oliver!. Waters has subsequently appeared on TV in the United Kingdom and Germany, and he has gone on to appear in the HBO miniseries The Pacific and also a Canadian production Darwin's Brave New World''''. In December 2015, he played the Cowardly Lion in a pantomime production of The Wizard of Oz at the Shaw Theatre, London.''

Filmography

Film

Television

External links

ABC interview with Mathew - An extract from an early interview with Mathew by ABC TV in Australia.

1989 births
Living people
Male actors from Sydney
Australian male stage actors
Australian male television actors